Manuel Bleda Rodríguez (born 31 July 1990), also known as Manolo Bleda, is a Spanish professional footballer who currently plays for Hong Kong Premier League club Lee Man as a center forward.

Club career

After playing for Alzira, Bleda had a six-month spell with Belshina Bobruisk in Belarus.

In August 2014, Bleda moved from Belshyna Babruisk to Tajik League side FC Istiklol on a contract until November 2014. Bleda scored twice on his competitive debut, Istiklol's 10-0 Tajik Cup victory over Khosilot Farkhor.
Bleda scored on his league debut for Istiklol after 16 minutes versus Parvoz on 16 October 2014.
On 22 November 2015,  Bleda scored FC Istiklol's 500th league goal. Bleda left Istiklol at the end of the 2015 season after his contract wasn't renewed.

At the start of March 2016, Bleda signed for Romanian Liga II side Ceahlăul Piatra Neamț.

On 3 July 2019, Kitchee announced the addition of Bleda to their club. On 20 October 2020, Kitchee head coach Chu Chi Kwong stated that Bleda had unilaterally terminated his contract with the club. However, two weeks later, Chu stated that the club were still locked in a dispute with Bleda over his contract and Kitchee may resort to legal action.

On 12 March 2021, Bleda signed with Hong Kong club Lee Man and was given the number 9 shirt.

Career statistics

Club

Honors
Istiklol
 Tajik League (2): 2014, 2015
 Tajik Cup (2): 2014, 2015
 Tajik Supercup: 2015

Kitchee
 Hong Kong Premier League: 2019–20
 Hong Kong Sapling Cup: 2019–20

Notes

References

External links

1990 births
Living people
Association football forwards
Spanish footballers
Atlético Levante UD players
UD Alzira footballers
CD Castellón footballers
FC Belshina Bobruisk players
CSM Ceahlăul Piatra Neamț players
Expatriate footballers in Belarus
Spanish expatriate footballers
FC Istiklol players
Expatriate footballers in Tajikistan
Expatriate footballers in Romania
Expatriate footballers in Hong Kong
Eastern Sports Club footballers
Kitchee SC players
Lee Man FC players
Tajikistan Higher League players
Hong Kong Premier League players